Bertil Larsson may refer to:

 Bertil Larsson (footballer), Swedish  footballer
 Bertil Larsson (sailor) (born 1954), Swedish sailor